David Gagen (born 11 August 1953) is a former speedway rider from England.

Speedway career 
Gagen rode in the top tier of British Speedway from 1972 to 1983, riding for various clubs. He reached the final of the British Speedway Championship in 1977.

References 

1953 births
British speedway riders
Boston Barracudas riders
Coventry Bees riders
King's Lynn Stars riders
Sportspeople from King's Lynn
Living people